Nyembezi is a surname. Notable people with the surname include:

Nonkululeko Nyembezi-Heita (born 1960), South African engineer and businesswoman
Sibusiso Nyembezi (1919–2000), South African writer

Surnames of African origin